El Palmar is a corregimiento in Olá District, Coclé Province, Panama with a population of 1,256 as of 2010. Its population as of 1990 was 1,808; its population as of 2000 was 1,437.

References

Corregimientos of Coclé Province